Cruziohyla craspedopus, the fringed leaf frog or fringed tree frog, is a species of frog in the subfamily Phyllomedusinae.> It is found in the Amazonian lowlands in Brazil, Colombia, Ecuador, and Peru, and possibly in Bolivia.

Description
Adult males measure  and adult females  in snout–vent length. The head is slightly wider than it is long. The snout is sharply truncate in lateral view. The fingers and toes are webbed. The hind margin of the tarsus bear extensive dermal appendages forming irregular spurs. The dorsum has uniform dark green dorsal background coloration interspersed with irregular-shaped large pale blue-grey lichenose blotches. The flanks have narrow black lines. The undersides and concealed surfaces of the flanks and legs are yellow. When adhered to a surface, the yellow coloration becomes concealed which can aid in camouflage.

Habitat and conservation
It only descends to lower branches for breeding, which takes place in fallen trees holding small water pools. However, tadpoles have also been found in small pools on the ground.

Cruziohyla craspedopus is a rare species. It is not facing major threats, but it can locally suffer from habitat loss caused by human activities (e.g., agriculture). It occurs in several protected areas such as the Yasuni National Park in Ecuador and the Manú National Park in Peru.

References

craspedopus
Amphibians of Brazil
Amphibians of Colombia
Amphibians of Ecuador
Amphibians of Peru
Amphibians described in 1957
Taxonomy articles created by Polbot